is a fashion model, entertainer, YouTuber, and ABEMA announcer. She is from Kobe, Hyōgo Prefecture, Japan. She is signed to TRAPEZISTE.

Life and career 
At the end of her first year of high school, she was scouted by a female staff member at a model office in Kansai at Sannomiya Center Street and took lessons. She began modeling in her third year of high school, appearing in shows like "Kobe Collection", Kansai Collection, and "Tokyo Runway".

She moved to Tokyo in April 2015 at the age of 19. As soon as she moved to Tokyo, she appeared in a TV commercial for Suntory's "Iemon Tokucha", and also modelled for other advertisements. She also appeared in music videos and television dramas to expand her career. She won first place in the second consecutive magazine issue of the serialized project "WHO'S THE Next" for men's fashion magazine warp MAGAZINE JAPAN. She was also appointed as the "KOBE Minato Ambassador" for the second consecutive time at the SANNOMIYA COLLECTION.

From April 3, 2017, to April 1, 2022, Kijima was the seventh weather presenter of ZIP!, aired on Nippon TV. This was both her first live broadcast program and her first regular appearance on a TV program. In June 2021, she won first place in the "17th Favorite Weather Caster/Weather Forecaster Ranking" by Oricon.

Among her predecessors at ZIP!, no weather presenter had served for more than two years, but Kijima was a weather presenter there for five years. She announced her graduation from the program on March 25, 2022, with her final appearance as a weather presenter being aired on April 1, 2022. Though she has graduated, she continues to appear irregularly on ZIP!.

Beginning in the November issue released on September 20, 2018, Kijima became an exclusive model for the magazine non-no.

On August 24, 2019, she became an ambassador for Kobe City Cruise Weeks. Her first calendar was released on November 2. On July 22, 2020, she was appointed as the official "Nyan Ambassador" for "Neko ga Kawaii Dake Exhibition: The Distance!". On October 15, she announced the opening of her official YouTube channel "Asukasanchi." On November 24, MASK WEAR TOKYO released "Neko Mask", designed after Kijima's cats Towa and Taiga.

Beginning April 11, 2021, she has been DAM CHANNEL's 18th MC.

On April 25, 2022, Kijima released her first photobook "Asukashiki."

On August 4, 2022, she became the official announcer for ABEMA.

Personal life 
She is the eldest of five siblings, having two younger sisters and two younger brothers.

Her favorite foods are ramen, curry rice, and hamburg steak, especially cheese in hamburg steak. Kijima has stated that she likes hamburg steak so much that she eats it more than three times a week. Her favorite sweets are Mont Blanc cake and wagashi. She also likes high balls and whiskey. She dislikes fish.

She enjoys walks and playing games. Kijima plays games like Nintendo Switch and PlayStation 4 as well as Apex Legends so often she can be said to be a "gamer girl". She sometimes hides her real name and meets ordinary people she met in game.

Her specialty is typing. According to Kijima, she was the fastest in her grade during middle school. She also holds an Information Processing Certification, which she obtained when she was in high school. Although it was only for 10 months, she belonged to a judo club in middle school. She worked part time during high school and did not take part in any clubs.

In professional baseball, she is a fan of the Yomiuri Giants. On June 21, 2019, she threw the first pitch for an interleague play between the Giants and Softbank at Tokyo Dome. As a child, she often visited Kobe Sports Park Baseball Stadium. During ZIP! when she visited the stadium, now Hotto Motto Field Kobe, she commented that she once visited with her family and watched a game of the Orix Blue Wave (now Orix Buffaloes).

Filmography

Films

Television shows

Web series

Radio 
 Weekend Fun（Rainbow Town FM, August 29, 2020）
 PlayStation presents My Game & My Life with Lime Star Udamaru (TBS Radio, May 13, 2021）

Web program 

 Yurufuwa Time（July 17, 2022 - Youtube「Yurufuwa Time」）- MC

Karaoke 

 DAM Channel（April 11, 2021–）- MC

Game 

 eBASEBALL Professional Baseball Splits 2021 Grandslam（July 2021, Konami）- As herself

Commercials 

 Elemental Story（August 22, 2015）
 Lotte "Simon Tonegawa Edition"
 Suntory Iemon Tokucha・Tokucha Caffeine Zero
 Elemental Story「With Everyone」
 Honda「Honda Cars」（Kinki Area Only）
 Shimamura「Let's play in a one piece」
 AEON「TOPVALU HOME COORDY」（2017）
 Shiseido「Junpaku Senka Suppin Snow White Essence」（2019）
 Himawari Securities Co., Ltd. (December 20, 2019)
 DHC ULUMiNISTA「Protect your beauty, busy every day」（April 17, 2020–）
 DANBALL ONE「Want to buy cheap cardboard」「Trouble finding a place to put cardboard boxes」（2020）
 Galibaa（2020）
 Nissui「Edamame Konbu Rice Balls with Sticky Barley!」『Breakfast Reporter』（2020）
 DHC「Dense urumi color lip balm 」(September 11, 2020)
 Refrear「Clear contact lense」 (2020)
 Trend Micro「Virus Buster for Home Network」(2020)
 Air Doctor×ZIP!、Kiyo Pyrethrum "Portable Air Doctor Deodorant"(January 8, 2021)
 YB-LAB.「Glamorous leggings」（November 27, 2021–）
 KATE「Lip Monster 」（April 2022 ）
 Pierrot（May 2022）
 Clinic Fore（May 2022）
 FREEDiVE「MUGEN WiFi」

Music video

Event 

 KOBE COLLECTION
 KANSAI COLLECTION
 TOKYO RUNWAY
 SAPPORO COLLECTION
 Fashion Cantata from KYOTO
 m-int kobe FashionShow
 NAMBA FASHION FESTA
 Japan Women's Expo
 OSAKA KAWAii!!
 MARUKO
 HARAJUKU WEEK
 IZA

Books

Magazine 

 non-no（November 2018 issue–, Shueisha） - Exclusive model

Digital photobook 

 Spi/San Gravure Photobook『Smile Tomorrow』（Shogakukan - Published June 29, 2020）
 FRIDAY Digital Photobook『透明な素肌 (Transparent Bare Skin)』（Kondasha - Published January 29, 2021）
 Spi/San Gravure Photobook『New World』（Shogakukan - Published February 15, 2021）

Calendar 

 Asuka Kijima 2020 Calendar (TRIX, November 2, 2019)
 Asuka Kijima 2021 Calendar (TRIX, October 24, 2020)
 Asuka Kijima 2022 Calendar (TRIX, November 1, 2021)

Photobook 

 Asukashiki.(Published April 25, 2022, Shogakukan、Photography：Kazutaka Nakamura、Leslie Kee、Maki Taguchi)

Other 

 One Day Police Chief Koiwa Police Station (December 13, 2021)
 One Day Police Chief Atago Police Station (March 10, 2022)

Notes

References

See also 
 List of people from Kobe city

External links 
 Asuka Kijima Official Profile - TRAPEZISTE

Living people
1996 births
People from Kobe
Japanese female models